Pyrenodesmia is a genus of lichen-forming fungi in the family Teloschistaceae. It has 23 species. The genus was circumscribed in 1852 by Italian lichenologist Abramo Bartolommeo Massalongo.

Species

Pyrenodesmia aetnensis 
Pyrenodesmia albopruinosa 
Pyrenodesmia albopustulata 
Pyrenodesmia alociza 
Pyrenodesmia aractina 
Pyrenodesmia badioreagens 
Pyrenodesmia bicolor 
Pyrenodesmia bullata 
Pyrenodesmia ceracea 
Pyrenodesmia chalybaea 
Pyrenodesmia concreticola 
Pyrenodesmia duplicata 
Pyrenodesmia erodens 
Pyrenodesmia haematites 
Pyrenodesmia micromarina 
Pyrenodesmia micromontana 
Pyrenodesmia microstepposa 
Pyrenodesmia molariformis 
Pyrenodesmia peliophylla 
Pyrenodesmia pratensis 
Pyrenodesmia tianshanensis 
Pyrenodesmia variabilis 
Pyrenodesmia viridirufa

References

Teloschistales
Lichen genera
Teloschistales genera
Taxa described in 1853
Taxa named by Abramo Bartolommeo Massalongo